Elena Maria Bonfanti (born 9 July 1988 in Milan) is an Italian sprinter.

Biography
She competed in the 4 × 400 m relay event at the 2012 Summer Olympics.

National records
 4x400 metres relay indoor: 3:31.99 ( Sopot, 8 March 2014) - with Maria Enrica Spacca, Marta Milani, Chiara Bazzoni

Achievements

See also
Italy at the 2012 Summer Olympics

References

External links
 

Athletes from Milan
Italian female sprinters
1988 births
Living people
Olympic athletes of Italy
Athletes (track and field) at the 2012 Summer Olympics
World Athletics Championships athletes for Italy
Mediterranean Games gold medalists for Italy
Athletes (track and field) at the 2013 Mediterranean Games
Mediterranean Games medalists in athletics
Olympic female sprinters